Siddington is a civil parish in Cheshire East, England. It contains 23 buildings that are recorded in the National Heritage List for England as designated listed buildings.  Of these, three are listed at Grade II*, the middle grade, and the others are at Grade II.  The major building in the parish is Capesthorne Hall; the hall, its chapel and chapel gates, and three other structures in the grounds are listed.  Otherwise, apart from the village of Siddington, the parish is rural, and most of the listed buildings are farms, farm buildings, houses, cottages, and associated structures.  The other listed buildings are a church with a cross base in the churchyard, a mill, and a bridge.

Key

Buildings

References

Citations

Sources

 

Listed buildings in the Borough of Cheshire East
Lists of listed buildings in Cheshire